The surname “Fryar” has its earliest origins in medieval England, first appearing in the 14th century.  The name was also found in Lothian where they were seated from early recorded times and their first records appear on the census rolls taken by the early Kings to determine the rate of taxation of their subjects. The name was given to a person who was a friar.  The surname Fryar was derived from the old French word "frère", which means "brother" in English and dates from the 13th century. The French word "frère" in turn comes from the Latin word "frater", which also means "brother". One reason for the variation in spelling is that medieval English lacked definite spelling rules. Names were rarely spelled consistently during these times when most people were illiterate. Scribes and church officials recorded names as they sounded, rather than adhering to specific rules and consequently, the variant surname Fryar first appeared.

Fryar is a relatively common surname in Northern Ireland. This was due in part to the significant emigration of influential protestants from England to Northern Ireland following the Battle of the Boyne. Fryars were some of the first immigrants to arrive in North America during the 18th century and Australia in the 19th century. Consequently, the frequency of the surname is now greater in both these two countries compared to its English origin.

People with the surname
Albert Fryar (1875–1944), Australian philatelist and sportsman
Chris Fryar (born 1970), US jazz entertainer
Elmer E. Fryar (1915–1944), US Medal of Honor recipient
Freddy Fryar (born 1936), US racing car driver pioneer
Godfrey Fryar (born 1950), Australian Anglican bishop
Hal Fryar (1927–2017), US actor and television personality
Irving Fryar (born 1962), retired US pro football player
Pearl Fryar (born 1939), US topiary artist
Samuel Fryar (1863–1938), Irish solicitor and politician
Steve Fryar (1953–2017), US professional rodeo cowboy
William Fryar (1828–1912), Australian surveyor and politician

References

See also 
Frere
Freer (disambiguation)
Fryer (surname)
Frier
Fryars, British musician